Chess has risen in popularity in India in the last few decades primarily due to chess Grandmaster and former 5-time World Champion Viswanathan Anand.

It is believed that chess originated from Chaturanga of ancient India. The All India Chess Federation is the governing body for chess in India.

Indian Chess in Numbers

Records / Firsts
 First National Champion: Ramchandra Sapre (1955).
 First Indian International Master: Manuel Aaron (1961).
 First Indian Grandmaster: Viswanathan Anand (1988).
 First Indian Women's Grandmaster: Subbaraman Vijayalakshmi (2001).
 First Indian participation in a Chess Olympiad: 1956, 12th Chess Olympiad at Moscow.
 First Blind Chess Olympiad hosted by India: 2012, 14th Blind Chess Olympiad in Chennai.
 First Indian Asian Senior Chess Champion (65+): Wazeer Ahmad Khan, 6th Asian Seniors at Lar in 2015.
 Youngest Indian Grandmaster: R Praggnanandhaa at the age of 12. (2018)
 Maximum number of Indian National Championship wins: 9 by Manuel Aaron.
 Maximum number of Indian National Championship (Women) wins: 6 by Subbaraman Vijayalakshmi.
 Maximum number of Indian National Championship (Blind) wins: 6 by Kishan Gangolli.

World Champions
Viswanathan Anand, held the FIDE title from 2000 to 2002, and the unified title from 2007 to 2013.

Highest rated players
The highest ranked Indian players are:
 Viswanathan Anand, ranked 16th in the world as of November 2021 with a rating of 2751.
 Koneru Humpy, ranked 3rd in the world (Women's FIDE ratings) as of November 2021 with a rating of 2586.
 Nihal Sarin, ranked 5th in the world (Junior FIDE ratings) as of December 2021 with a rating of 2662.
 Vaishali Rameshbabu, ranked 7th in the world (Girls Junior FIDE ratings) as of December 2021 with a rating of 2401.

Average national rating
The average rating of India on the FIDE list (as of Dec 2021) is 2670.

World Top Lists
As of November 2021, the following is the number of Indian chess players in various segments:

World's Top 100: 6
World's Top 100 Women: 6
World's Top 100 Juniors (age under 20): 20
World's Top 100 Girls (age under 20): 12

GM and WGM Titles
India has produced:

 75 Grandmasters. The latest GM is Pranav.

Medals won by Indian Chess Team

Player statistics

Men
The top 10 Indian grandmasters as of September 2022 are listed below. For the first time ever, in the year 2022, India has 8 players in top 100 FIDE Open rating list in 2022.

Viswanathan Anand is currently No. 15 in the FIDE World Rankings and the former World Champion. Viswanathan "Vishy" Anand (born 11 December 1969) is an Indian chess grandmaster and former world chess champion. He became the first grandmaster from India in 1988, and is one of the few players to have surpassed an Elo rating of 2800, a feat he first achieved in 2006

Women
The top 10 women Indian chess players are listed below as of November 2013.

Blind players

The top blind Indian chess players are listed below as of December 2021.

Notes

See also
List of Indian chess players
Indian chess
All India Chess Federation for the Blind
Chess Players Association of India

References

External links
 All India Chess Federation
 The History of Chess: from the Time of the Early Invention of the Game in India till the Period of its establishment in Western and Central Europe